Melissa S.A. is a Greek tomato sauce and pasta company, one of the major brands in the country. It is packaged with paper cartons and Tetra Brik.

Logo

Its logo has a red oval facing left to right with white rims. It has its company name in the middle.

Information

Its packaging colour is coloured green and features tomato sauce in the middle.

See also
Kyknos S.A.
Pelargos
List of companies in Greece

companies based in Athens
Greek pasta companies
Greek brands